William Spankie (17 October 1859 – 27 May 1934) was a Conservative member of the House of Commons of Canada. He was born in Kingston, Canada West and became a physician.

He attended private and public schools in Kingston, Ontario then proceeded to Queen's University where he received Bachelor of Arts, MD and CM degrees. Spankie served as president of the Medical Councils of Ontario and of Canada.

From 1886 to 1912, he was a public school inspector at Frontenac County. In 1913, he became a warden of the county, and from that year until 1929 he was reeve of Wolfe Island.

He ran unsuccessfully in the 1919 provincial election and was first elected to Parliament at the Frontenac—Addington riding in a by-election on 22 July 1929 then re-elected there in the 1930 federal election. Spankie died on 27 May 1934 before completing his term in the 17th Canadian Parliament.

References

External links
 

1859 births
1934 deaths
Physicians from Ontario
Conservative Party of Canada (1867–1942) MPs
Members of the House of Commons of Canada from Ontario
Mayors of places in Ontario
Queen's University at Kingston alumni